In Islamic architecture, Şerefe is an architectural element of a mosque minaret. 

Şerefe is a wraparound balcony of a minaret where the muezzin (person who calls for prayer) recites the ezan. Although now the ezan is typically recited by modern equipment without using the şerefe, the şerefes are still considered as essential parts of a minaret. Access to şerefe is via a staircase in the minaret and the door of the şerefe is on the side facing the Qibla.

In most mosques there is only one şerefe in a minaret. But in bigger mosques and especially in Selatin mosques of the Ottoman Empire there may be more than one şerefe in a minaret. For example Sultan Ahmed Mosque in Istanbul, also called the Blue Mosque, (completed in 1616) has six minarets. There are three şerefes in four minarets and two şerefes in the other two minarets. The total number of 16 şerefes represent 16 members of the Ottoman dynasty (14 sultans including Ahmet I and two claimants to throne during the Ottoman Interregnum.)

References

Islamic architectural elements
Minarets